Since the professionalism in 1994, the annual awards will be given to clubs, players, managers and referees based on their performance after the season ended. This article is about all annual awards in the history of Chinese Jia-A League and Chinese Super League.

Awards

League trophies 

 Shanghai Shenhua were stripped of the title on 19 February 2013 for the match-fixing scandal in this season.

Player of the Year

Golden Boot Award

Top Chinese Goalscorer

Manager of the Year

Youth Player of the Year

U-23 Player of the Year

Goalkeeper of the Year

Golden Whistle of the Year

Golden Flag of the Year

References 

Chinese Super League trophies and awards